The Wijhe Ferry is a cable ferry across the IJssel in the Netherlands. The ferry crosses from Wijhe in Overijssel to Vorchten in Gelderland.

Ferries of the Netherlands
Cable ferries